The Poet Laureate of West Virginia is the poet laureate for the U.S. state of West Virginia. West Virginia established the position of Poet Laureate by statute in 1927. The appointment was defined by statute as "at the pleasure of the Governor", but has become an indefinitely renewable two-year term.

List of Poets Laureate

 Karl Myers (1927–1937) 
 Roy Lee Harmon (March 12, 1937 – 1943) 
 James Lowell McPherson (1943–1946) 
 Roy Lee Harmon (October 11, 1946 – 1960)
 Vera Andrews Harvey (1960–1961)
 Roy Lee Harmon (March 7, 1961 – 1979)
 Louse McNeil (Pease) (1979–1993)
 Irene McKinney (1994–2012)
 Marc Harshman (2012– )

See also

 Poet laureate
 List of U.S. states' poets laureate
 United States Poet Laureate

References

External links
  Poet Laureate at West Virginia State Agency Directory
 West Virginia Poet Laureate at Library of Congress

 
West Virginia culture
American Poets Laureate